Terebutenets is a rural locality (a railway station) under the administrative jurisdiction of the Urban-Type Settlement of Nebolchi in Lyubytinsky District of Novgorod Oblast, Russia, located approximately  east-southeast of Saint Petersburg,  northwest of Moscow, and about  southeast of Nebolchi.

Geography
Terebutenets is situated to the northeast of the Valdai Hills amidst deciduous and coniferous forests. Close nearby, within a radius of 5–10 km, are many lakes, including Mikhaylinskoye, Siverik, and Dolgoye. Hunting and fishing are popular recreational activities in the area.

History and demographics
It was founded in the 1930s and has a population of about 30.

Climate

Rural localities in Novgorod Oblast